William Edward Wilson (March 9, 1870 – September 29, 1948) was an American educator, businessman, and politician from Indiana. He served one term in the United States House of Representatives (1923–1925).

Early life and education
Born in Mount Vernon, Indiana, Wilson was the son of Jay W. Wilson (1819-1893) and Mary (Chaffin) Wilson (1832-1925). He attended the public schools of Posey County and Evansville Commercial College.

Career 
Wilson began his career as a teacher at the Evansville Commercial College. He later purchased the school and served as principal from 1888 to 1904. After retiring from the school, Wilson worked as an accountant for a wholesale hardware company and secretary-treasurer of the Evansville insurance business run by his wife's family.

Politics
He served as deputy auditor of Vanderburgh County, Indiana from 1910 to 1912, and clerk of the circuit court of Vanderburg County from 1912 to 1920. He was an unsuccessful candidate for election in 1920 to the Sixty-seventh Congress.

Wilson was elected as a Democrat to the Sixty-eighth Congress (March 4, 1923 – March 3, 1925). He was an unsuccessful candidate for reelection in 1924 to the Sixty-ninth Congress. Wilson's unsuccessful race for reelection, during which the Ku Klux Klan actively opposed him, was later chronicled by his son in an article for American Heritage magazine.

After leaving Congress, Wilson was president of the Lincoln Savings Bank, and he was later employed by Chrysler.

Personal life
In 1900, Wilson married Nettie Cook (1874-1945), the daughter of Stephen H. S. and Esther (Jarvis) Cook. They were the parents of two children, including author and college professor William E. Wilson (1906-1988).

He died in Evansville, Indiana, September 29, 1948. He was interred in Oak Hill Cemetery.

References

Sources

Magazines

Books

Newspapers

External sources

1870 births
1948 deaths
People from Mount Vernon, Indiana
Democratic Party members of the United States House of Representatives from Indiana